Cyrtodactylus meersi,  also known commonly as the Bago Yoma bent-toed gecko, is a species of lizard in the family Gekkonidae. The species is endemic to Myanmar.

Etymology
The specific name, meersi, is in honor of John Meers for his support of karst biology research in Southeast Asia.

Geographic range
C. meersi is found in Bago Region, Myanmar.

Description
The adult size of C. meersi is unknown. The species was described from a single juvenile specimen, the holotype.

Reproduction
The mode of reproduction of C. meersi is unknown.

References

Further reading
Grismer LL, Wood PL Jr, Quah ESH, Murdoch ML, Grismer MS, Herr MW, Espinoza RE, Brown RM, Lin A (2018). "A phylogenetic taxonomy of the Cyrtodactylus peguensis group (Reptilia: Squamata: Gekkonidae) with descriptions of two new species from Myanmar". PeerJ 6: e5575. (Cyrtodactylus meersi, new species).

Cyrtodactylus
Reptiles described in 2018
Endemic fauna of Myanmar
Reptiles of Myanmar